Deadheading can refer to the following:

Dead mileage (AKA Deadheading), the movement of commercial vehicles in non-revenue mode for logistical reasons
Deadheading (flowers), the pruning of dead flower heads
Deadheading (employee), carrying, free of charge, a transport company's own staff on a normal passenger trip

See also
Deadhead (disambiguation)